Thomas Martin Connelly (October 20, 1897 – February 18, 1941) was an American outfielder in Major League Baseball who played five games in 1920 and 1921 for the New York Yankees. He was born in Chicago, Illinois. In his career, he failed to hit any home runs, had no runs batted in, and batted .167. He died at age 43 in Hines, Illinois.

External links

1897 births
1941 deaths
Major League Baseball outfielders
New York Yankees players
Baseball players from Chicago